"Hands of a Working Man" is a song written by D. Vincent Williams and Jim Collins, and recorded by American country music artist Ty Herndon. It was released in January 1999 as the third single from his album, Big Hopes. The song reached number 5 on the Billboard Hot Country Singles & Tracks chart in May 1999, and was Herndon's last Top Ten country hit.

Critical reception
Chuck Taylor, of Billboard magazine reviewed the song favorably saying that the Herndon "offers a solid song and a strong performance that should be widely embraced by country programmers and the working-class listeners who live this lyric."

Music video
The music video was directed by Chris Rogers and premiered in early 1999.

Chart performance

Year-end charts

References

1999 singles
1998 songs
Ty Herndon songs
Songs written by Jim Collins (singer)
Song recordings produced by Byron Gallimore
Epic Records singles
Songs written by D. Vincent Williams